The South African Railways Class 9E, Series 2 of 1982 is an electric locomotive.

In 1982 and 1983, the South African Railways expanded its existing Class 9E fleet by placing six new Class 9E, Series 2 General Electric Company  electric locomotives with a Co-Co wheel arrangement in service on the Sishen-Saldanha iron ore line.

Manufacturer
The 50 kV AC Class 9E, Series 2 electric locomotive was designed for the South African Railways (SAR) by the General Electric Company (GEC) and was built by Union Carriage & Wagon (UCW) in Nigel, Transvaal.

GEC works numbers were allocated to Class 9E locomotives. UCW delivered six locomotives in 1982 and 1983, numbered in the range from E9026 to E9031.

Characteristics
The locomotive has a single full width air conditioned cab. At the rear end, the body work is lower to provide clearance for the 50 kV AC electrical equipment which is mounted on the roof. This consists of a single pantograph, a potential divider, a vacuum circuit breaker, a surge diverter and the main transformer’s high voltage terminal. The electrical control system is solid state, using thyristors.

Since huge voltage drops are often encountered between electric sub-stations, the locomotive was designed to be able to operate on a supply varying between 55 and 25 kV AC.

Series 2 locomotives were delivered with five braking systems; air brakes for the locomotive, train air braking, train vacuum braking, a handbrake and dynamic rheostatic braking which can dissipate . The Series 1 locomotives were delivered without a vacuum brake system.

By 2007, the entire fleet of both series of Class 9E electric locomotives were upgraded with Alstom's Agate train control and communication technology. The pantographs on most of these locomotives were also replaced by the single arm type.

The Series 1 and Series 2 Class 9Es can be visually distinguished from each other by their bogies, which were redesigned for the Series 2 locomotives.

Service
Class 9E locomotives are used on the  Sishen-Saldanha iron ore line to haul export ore from the open cast iron mines at Sishen in the Northern Cape to the harbour at Saldanha in the Western Cape. Most of the route is across the hot and dry Northern Cape, but the last  to Saldanha runs parallel to the Atlantic coastline and is subjected to the fog and corrosive sea air of the West Coast.

Liveries
The whole series was delivered in the SAR red oxide livery with signal red cowcatchers, yellow whiskers and with the number plates on the sides mounted on three-stripe yellow wings. In the late 1990s they were all repainted in the Spoornet blue livery with either solid or outline numbers on the sides.

Illustration

References

Cape gauge railway locomotives
Co-Co locomotives
3070
GEC locomotives
Railway locomotives introduced in 1982
Union Carriage & Wagon locomotives
50 kV AC locomotives